The Public Accounts Committee (PAC) is a committee of selected members of parliament, constituted by the Parliament of India, for the purpose of auditing the revenue and the expenditure of the Government of India. They check that parliament exercises over the executive stems from the basic principle that parliament embodies the will of the people. This committee along with the  Estimates committee (EC) and Committee on Public Undertakings (COPU) are the three financial standing committees of the Parliament of India.

It serves as a check on the government especially with respect to its expenditure bill and its primary function is to examine the audit report of Comptroller and Auditor General (C&AG) after it is laid in the Parliament. C&AG assists the committee during the course of investigation. None of its members are allowed to be ministers in the government. The main function of the committee is to ascertain whether the money granted by parliament has been spent by government within the scope of the demand.

The Public Accounts Committee consists of not more than twenty-two members, fifteen elected by Lok Sabha, the lower house of the Parliament, and not more than seven members of Rajya Sabha, the upper house of the Parliament. The members are elected every year from amongst its members of respective houses according to the principle of proportional representation by means of single transferable vote. The chairperson is appointed by the Lok Sabha speaker. The term of office of the members is one year.

At present, the 16th Lok Sabha has no designated leader of opposition, however the Indian National Congress (INC) being largest opposition party has gotten the responsibility of heading the PAC. The current PAC is headed by Adhir Ranjan Chowdhury since July, 2019 after Mallikarjun Kharge, who was leader of INC in the Lok Sabha. He was re-appointed to a second term in May 2018.

History 
The committee was first conceived in the year 1921 in the wake of Montagu-Chelmsford Reforms. During the initial days of British colonial government in India, the finance member of the executive council was the chairperson of the committee.

Post independence, until 1950 the chairperson of the committee was the finance minister. However, in 1950, the country became republic and the committee became a parliamentary committee functioning under the control of the Speaker of Lok Sabha with a non-official chairperson. From 1950 to 1967, the chairperson was selected from the ruling party. Since 1967, the chairperson of the committee is selected from the opposition, usually the leader of opposition.

Prior to the year 1954–55, the committee consisted of 15 members who were elected by Lok Sabha from amongst its members. But with effect from the year 1954–55, 7 members from the Rajya Sabha have also been elected to the committee.

Scope and working 
As stated earlier, the primary function of the PAC is to examine the audit report of Comptroller and Auditor General (C&AG) after it is laid in the Parliament. The audit by the C&AG is comprehensive and manifold. It involves among others, (a) accountancy audit, (b) regularity audit, (c) appropriation audit, (d) discretionary audit and (e) efficiency-cum-performance audit.

At the beginning of its term every year, the committee makes a selection of audit paragraphs included in the various reports of C&AG for in-depth examination. After holding deliberations and taking note of the time available at its disposal, the committee selects the most important paragraphs from the audit reports for detailed examination and submits its reports to the House on them.

Current composition 
Keys:       = 22 members

Sub-committees 
Currently there are 4 sub-committees within the PAC. They are as follows.

Probes in recent years   
The C&AG report on the 2G spectrum case stated a loss of ₹1.76 trillion (US$25 billion), based on 2010 3G and BWA spectrum-auction prices. The ensuing differences resulting from the then opposition party BJP's demand to set up a joint parliamentary committee in addition to the PAC's inquiry into the 2G spectrum allocation case led to a complete freeze between the government and opposition in the winter session of parliament of 2010. The then PM Manmohan Singh stated that he was willing to appear before the committee. This brought the committee to the forefront of the public's attention. Some of the probes since then are listed below :

2G spectrum case (2008) 

The Comptroller and Auditor General (C&AG) laid out in its report a seething inquest of the case, showing how then telecom minister A Raja and bureaucrats allegedly colluded to show undue favour to companies that lied or misrepresented basic information in their applications for 2G licenses. The C&AG report on the 2G spectrum case stated a loss of ₹1.76 trillion (US$25 billion). The initial estimate of loss was 57,000 crores but was revised upward of 1.76 lakh crores. The committee, on 4 April 2011, summoned Ratan Tata, chairman of the Tata group; and Niira Radia, a corporate lobbyist, regarding the case. The then PAC chairperson Murli Manohar Joshi asked Congress members to apologise to Comptroller and Auditor General of India for making allegations against it.

Commonwealth Games case (2010) 

The 2010 Commonwealth Games hosted by India was subject of multiple allegations of corruption. The Public Accounts Committee has faulted the then Congress-led UPA government for taking the games management out of the government machinery leading to a "number of errors" that almost resulted in the "biggest management failure". The report was tabled in Parliament in April 2017.

Adarsh housing case (2011) 

In 2011, a report of the Comptroller and Auditor General of India (C&AG) said, "The episode of Adarsh Co-operative Housing Society reveals how a group of select officials, placed in key posts, could subvert rules and regulations in order to grab prime government land – a public property – for personal benefit."

Coal block allocation case (2012) 

The C&AG in its report estimated undue benefits to the tune ₹1.86 trillion (US$26 billion) to private players on account of coal blocks allocation to them without resorting to auction. The essence of the C&AG's argument is that the Government had the authority to allocate coal blocks by a process of competitive bidding, but chose not to. As a result, both public sector enterprises (PSEs) and private firms paid less than they might have otherwise.

VVIP Helicopter acquisition case (2013) 

Chairperson K V Thomas said in 2016 that the PAC was willing to take up the VVIP case again, although PAC, when it was headed by his predecessor and senior BJP leader Murli Manohar Joshi, had examined the report of the Comptroller and Auditor General (CAG) in 2013.

Demonetisation of November 8, 2016

Being an unprecedented step it was much highlighted in the national and international news with a number of people criticizing the move and government acclaiming it as a surgical strike against black money. But then PAC head K. V. Thomas, member of INC, took a serious note of the move and started probing the move wherein it decided to call RBI governor Urjit Patel, Finance Secretary Ashok Lavasa and Economic Affairs Secretary Shaktikanta Das. The decision was taken unanimously by all the members of the committee to call the bureaucratic officers.

Chairpersons

Pre-independence

* Served second non-consecutive terms

After independence

† Denotes the year 1967–68 from  when the chairman of the PAC was member of the main opposition party, usually the leader of opposition.

Longest serving chairpersons of PAC

Reports Published 
As part of its oversight process the committee has published quite a number of reports over the course of its existence post declaration of republic in 1950. The committee has published a total of 1596 reports from 1950 to April 2018.

See also 

17th Lok Sabha
Committee on Public Undertakings
Estimates Committee
Standing Committee on Defence (India)
Standing Committee on Finance
List of Indian parliamentary committees

External links 

 Lok Sabha - Public Accounts Committee Homepage

References 

Committees of the Parliament of India
India